is a professional Japanese baseball player. He plays outfielder for the Tohoku Rakuten Golden Eagles.

References 

1996 births
Living people
Baseball people from Hyōgo Prefecture
Ritsumeikan University alumni
Japanese baseball players
Nippon Professional Baseball outfielders
Tohoku Rakuten Golden Eagles players